Keiferia lycopersicella, the tomato pinworm,  is a moth of the family Gelechiidae. It is found in warm areas in Mexico, California, Texas, Georgia, Florida, Hawaii, Cuba, Hispaniola and the Bahamas. It has also been reported from greenhouses in Delaware, Mississippi, Missouri, Pennsylvania and Virginia.

The wingspan is 9–12 mm. There are seven to eight generations per year.

The larvae feed on Solanaceae species, including Lycopersicon esculentum, Solanum melongena, Solanum tuberosum, Solanum carolinense, Solanum xanthii, Solanum umbelliferum and Solanum bahamense. Young larvae use silk to spin a tent. Under the cover of this tent they create a tunnel into a leaf of their host. Continued feeding results in a blotch-like mine which can usually be found on that same leaf. The third and fourth larval instars feed from within tied leaves or folded portions of a leaf. They may also enter stems or fruits.

External links
Tomato pinworm
Species info
bugwood.org

lycopersicella
Moths of North America
Moths of Central America
Insects of the Caribbean
Insects of Cuba
Insects of the Dominican Republic
Insects of Haiti
Insects of Hawaii
Fauna of the California chaparral and woodlands
Fauna of the Southeastern United States
Moths described in 1897
Taxa named by Thomas de Grey, 6th Baron Walsingham